Dalavaipatti is a census town in Salem district  in the state of Tamil Nadu, India.

Demographics
 India census, Dalavaipatti had a population of 6256. Males constitute 52% of the population and females 48%. Dalavaipatti has an average literacy rate of 54%, lower than the national average of 59.5%: male literacy is 63% and, female literacy is 45%. In Dalavaipatti, 13% of the population is under 6 years of age.

References

Cities and towns in Salem district